The Premio Nacional de Música is a Cuban cultural award, inaugurated in 1997 and presented annually by the Instituto Cubano de la Música. The prize honours Cuban musicians who live in Cuba for their contributions to the national music scene. It forms part of a range of awards under the rubric of Premios Nacionales de Cuba.

List of winners

References

Cuban music